Bogoro is a Local Government Area of Bauchi State, Nigeria. Its headquarters are in the town of Bogoro. Za’ar or Sayawa people are the majority of its inhabitants.

The postal code of the area is 741.

Notable people
 Rt. Hon. Yakubu Dogara (Speaker Nigerian House of Representatives) (2015 - 2019)
 Suleiman Elias Bogoro (Executive Secretary of Tertiary Education Trust Fund) (2014 - 2016) (2019-Date)
 Jude Rabo, vice-chancellor of Federal University, Wukari
 Rifkatu Samson Danna (Former member Bauchi State House of Assembly, representing BOGORO and former Commissioner for Environment, Bauchi state)
 Baba Peter Gonto (freedom fighter)
 Barr Bukata Zhyadi, former Bogoro local government chairman (1998).
 Dr. Bukata B. Bukar, former Commissioner of Water Resources, Bauchi State, Current Head of Department, Pharmacology. University of Jos.

References

Local Government Areas in Bauchi State